The list of ship commissionings in 2018 includes a chronological list of all ships commissioned in 2018.


See also

References

2018
 
Ships